Ion Atodiresei (born 14 May 1952) is a Romanian former football forward.

International career
In 1976 he played one match for Romania's national team, being used by coach Ștefan Kovács in a 1–1 friendly against Czechoslovakia.

Honours
UTA Arad
Divizia A: 1968–69, 1969–70
FCM Reșița
Divizia B: 1971–72

References

External links

Ion Atodiresei at Labtof.ro

1952 births
Living people
Romanian footballers
Romania international footballers
Association football forwards
Liga I players
Liga II players
FC UTA Arad players
Vagonul Arad players
CSM Reșița players
Sportspeople from Arad, Romania